The following is a list of music festivals in Taiwan. This list may have overlap with list of music festivals and List of festivals in Taiwan. Music festivals in Taiwan may focus on Taiwanese musicians or international musicians, and may be either in a concert or music competition format, or both. Music of Taiwan in contemporary times incorporates diverse genres, and Taiwan has many ongoing music festivals dedicated to pop music, Indigenous music, Indie Music, as well as Mandopop.

Festivals

Gallery

See also

Festivals of Taiwan
List of music festivals#Taiwan
Music of Taiwan
List of film festivals in Taiwan
List of tourist attractions in Taiwan
List of Taiwan-related topics

References

 T
Taiwan
Taiwan
Music
Festivals